The European Economic Association (EEA) is a professional academic body which links European economists. It was founded in the mid-1980s. Its first annual congress was in 1986 in Vienna and its first president was Jacques Drèze. The current president is Oriana Bandiera. The Association currently has around 3000 members. Its objectives are:
". . . to contribute to the development and application of economics as a science in Europe; to improve communication and exchange between teachers, researchers and students in economics in the different European countries; and to develop and sponsor co-operation between teaching institutions of university level and research institutions in Europe "

It publishes the Journal of the European Economic Association. In August of each year the Association, in collaboration with the Econometric Society organises a congress in a European city. The congress attracts around 1500 participants.

References

External links 
 

Economic policy in Europe
Economics societies
Higher education organisations based in Europe
Organizations established in 1984
Pan-European learned societies